Sarah Barrand (born 2 November 1985) is an English actress known for her role as Shannon Donnelly-Lawson in Footballers Wives and its ITV2 spin-off, Footballers' Wives: Extra Time. Barrand grew up in Southport, Merseyside.

She has played other roles on dramas such as Casualty, and in the films Stag Night, Caught in the Act, and The Kid. Sarah presented a two-part documentary for ITV, Date with the Dalai, with Footballers Wives co-star, Zöe Lucker. In addition to acting and presenting, Sarah is a voice over artist for numerous television, video games and radio broadcasts.

The MTV GB2B Cup was presented by Sarah, and she is a Celebrity Ambassador for WellChild.

She is a supporter of Liverpool F.C.

References

External links
 

1985 births
Living people
People from Southport
English television actresses
People educated at King George V College
Actresses from Merseyside
21st-century English actresses
English voice actresses
English radio actresses